Pagsibol is the first extended play of Filipino boy band SB19, released on July 22, 2021, by Sony Music. It consists of six tracks and is preceded by four singles, "What?", "Mapa", "Bazinga" and SLMT.

Background and development 
SB19 leader Pablo tells Elite Daily the group named their EP Pagsibol because it represents their musical journey. SB19 says one of their greatest influences throughout their career has been their family. Pablo wrote their song “MAPA” in dedication to his own parents when he was homesick during their 2020 Get In The Zone tour. They begins their EP with the uplifting pop anthem “What?,” which is about self-empowerment. "Pagsibol" was created to pays tribute to their roots and those who've believed in them since day one: their fans, who they call A’TIN. A Filipino word that literally translates to germination, as to how seeds grow into plants, “Pagsibol” is a metaphorical reference to the band's journey in the music industry. SB19 has asserted creative control over its material without sacrificing accessibility. This is evident in “Mana,” a throbbing banger that updates the band's electro-pop, R&B, rock, and hip-hop influences with rap and cinematic grandeur. The title is actually short for the Filipino mythical creature “manananggal,” which has the ability to sever its upper torso from the rest of its body. SB19 redefines the word to symbolize humility. With "Bazinga" the song was created to takes a swipe at the band's detractors online and offline, and reflects on the “bashing” culture that every artist experiences at the onset of his career. In the same vein as the band's more radio-friendly tunes, “SLMT” showcases the group's more effervescent side to its music-making. The insanely catchy bop honors “A’tin,” a community of like-minded individuals and fans to whom SB19 is eternally grateful.

Release and promotion 
SB19 begun teasing a comeback in March, with a caption, "What is Coming?". On June 30, the group posted a poster featuring the record's title and their logo. A week after, the release date has been revealed accompanied with a pre-save link. They also announced a postponement of their upcoming concert. A release scheduler was posted on July 14, 2021.The track list was shown a day after that featured the two released singles "What? and "Mapa", promotional single "Ikako", and three more songs. Concept photos were dropped for 6 days and the highlight medley was released a day before the release. Hours before the release, SB19 guested in Rolling Stone's Twitch stream and iHeartRadio to promote the extended play, "Pagsibol". It was released on streaming and digital platforms on July 22, 2021. A lyric video for "Bazinga" was then uploaded on YouTube on the same day.

The group has partnered with Spotify Philippines with a campaign that "showcases Pinoy pride and tells the story of SB19’s latest EP through audio and visual art". They collaborated with six Filipino visual artists to design jeepneys inspired by the six tracks on "Pagsibol".

In January 2022, SB19 launched premium merchandise line inspired by record-breaking EP, "Pagsibol". The exclusive merch line was conceptualized and produced by Sony Music Philippines, SB19, and ShowBT. Given SB19's status as one of the biggest and most awarded boybands in Asia, the team wanted to bring the same big-caliber treatment that fans of international. SB19's Justin De Dios serves as a co-creative director for the project, pitching in his input for all the studies and acting as liaison for the rest of the members when it comes to creative decisions.

Track listing

Release history

References 

SB19 EPs
2021 debut EPs